Lleyton Hewitt was the defending champion.

Hewitt successfully defended his title, defeating Ivo Minář 7–5, 6–0 in the final.

Seeds

Draw

Finals

Top half

Bottom half

References

 Main Draw
 Qualifying Draw

2005 Medibank International
2005 ATP Tour